James Cowan (14 April 1870 – 6 September 1943) was a pākehā New Zealand non-fiction author, noted for his books on colonial history and Māori ethnography. A fluent Māori speaker, he interviewed many veterans of the New Zealand Wars. His book The New Zealand wars: a history of the Māori campaigns and the pioneering period (1922–23) is his best known.

Early life
Cowan's father was William Andrew Cowan and was Irish. His mother Elizabeth Jane Qualtrough was his father's second wife. They were married in 1866. Cowen was born in East Tāmaki in 1870. He spent his childhood in Kihikihi, on the border of the King Country. The farm was on land confiscated from the Waikato Māori, and contained part of the site of the battlefield of Orakau. Settler militia were based at a military blockhouse close to his home, while there was a considerable Māori community in the area. The young Cowan grew up speaking both English and Māori. He never lost his fascination with Māori culture and the Land Wars.

Journalist and author
From 1887 to 1902, James Cowan was employed as a journalist for the New Zealand Herald in Auckland. His first books were published in 1901: a guide to Taupō and a catalogue of the Māori paintings of Gottfried Lindauer. In 1903 he began work for the Department of Tourist and Health Resorts in Wellington, writing magazine articles and books to promote tourism. New Zealand, or, Ao-teä-roa (the long bright world): its wealth and resources, scenery, travel routes, spas, and sport was written during this period.

By 1909, Cowan was a freelance writer and an amateur oral historian. The Maoris of New Zealand, written in 1910 was a general survey of Māori and in 1911 he wrote The adventures of Kimble Bent, about an American who deserted the colonial forces during the land wars and who lived alongside their Māori foes.

From 1918 until 1922 Cowan was paid by the Department of Internal Affairs and worked on the publication The New Zealand wars: a history of the Maori campaigns and the pioneering period. His writing style was adventure-based and relied on anecdotes.

Other books on colonial topics included The old frontier: Te Awamutu, the story of the Waipa Valley (1922),  Tales of the Maori coast (1930), Tales of the Maori bush (1934), and Hero stories of New Zealand (1935). Cowan also wrote on Māori ethnography for the Journal of the Polynesian Society, wrote The Maori yesterday and to-day, and co-wrote Legends of the Maori with Maui Pomare.

The First Labour Government granted James Cowan a pension in 1935, one of the first two New Zealand writers to receive state support. The deputation asking for this pension said of Cowan that he 'had never made any money out of his historical books but had done very good work for the country'.

Personal life and death 
Cowan died on 6 September 1943 in Wellington, and was survived by his wife Eileen Cowan and his two sons Roy and Jack.

References

External links

 
 
Works by James Cowan at the New Zealand Electronic Text Centre
A. H. McLintock (editor).  "James Cowan" in An Encyclopaedia of New Zealand, 1966.

1870 births
1943 deaths
New Zealand biographers
Male biographers
20th-century New Zealand historians